The indigenous languages of the Americas form various linguistic areas or Sprachbunds that share various common (areal) traits.

Overview
The languages of the Americas often can be grouped together into linguistic areas or Sprachbunds (also known as convergence areas). The linguistic areas identified so far deserve more research to determine their validity. Knowing about Sprachbunds helps historical linguists differentiate between shared areal traits and true genetic relationship. The pioneering work on American areal linguistics was a dissertation by Joel Sherzer, which was published as Sherzer (1976).

In American Indian Languages: the Historical Linguistics of Native America, Lyle Campbell also lists over 20 linguistic areas, many of which are still hypothetical.

Note: Some linguistic areas may overlap with others.

Lexical diffusion
Pache, et al. (2016) note that the word ‘dog’ is shared across various unrelated language families of the Americas, and use this word as a case study of lexical diffusion due to trade and contact.

In California, identical roots for ‘dog’ are found in:
Yurok cʼišah, Karuk čišiːh, Takelma cʼíxi, Yokuts *cʼɨːsas
Chimariko šičela, Wintu se-cilaː ‘to tear apart’
Wintun *suku, Maiduan *sɨː, Washo súkuʔ, Miwok *hayu, Costanoan (Awaswas and Chocheño; Chocheño has the form čukuti). Pache, et al. (2016) posit a Wintun origin for this root.
 *hayu root in Miwok, Pomoan, Wappo, and Hill Patwin
Ramaytush puku, Uto-Aztecan *punku
Costanoan (Mutsun xučekniṣ, Chalon xučekniṣ, and Rumsen xučːiys), Esselen hučumas (term borrowed from Costanoan; native terms are šošo and šanašo), Salinan (Antoniaño Salinan xuč (pl. xostén) and Migueleño Salinan xučaːi), Chumash (Ineseño Chumash huču, likely borrowed from Salinan)

In South America, a root for ‘dog’ is shared by Uru-Chipayan (paku or paqu) and several unrelated neighboring languages of lowland Bolivia (Movima pako, Itonama u-paʔu, and Trinitario paku), as well as Guaicuruan (Mocoví, Toba, and Pilagá pioq). An identical root for ‘dog’ is also shared by Huastec (*sul) and Atakapa (šul), which are very geographically distant from each other although both are located along the Gulf of Mexico coast. Areal words for ‘dog’ are also shared across the U.S. Southeast (Karankawa keš ~ kes, Chitimacha kiš, Cotoname kissa ‘fox’, Huavean *kisɨ), as well as across Mesoamerica. Mesoamerican areal words for ‘dog’ diffused unidirectionally from certain language families to others, and are listed below:
Proto-Mixe-Zoquean *ʔuku > Proto-Zapotec *kweʔkkoʔ (Ixtlán Zapotec beʔkoʔ) > Huastec pik’oʔ, Yucatec pè:k’
P’urhépecha wiču > Chontal wičuʔ
Totonacan čiči(ʔ) > Classical Nahuatl čiči

Northern Northwest Coast

This linguistic area was proposed by Jeff Leer (1991), and may be a subarea of the Northwest Coast Linguistic Area. This sprachbund contains languages that have strict head-final (XSOV) syntax. Languages are Aleut, Haida, Eyak, and Tlingit.

Leer (1991) considers the strong areal traits to be:
lack of labial obstruents
promiscuous number marking
periphrastic possessive construction

Northwest Coast

This linguistic area is characterized by elaborate consonant systems. Languages are Eyak, Tlingit, Athabaskan, Tsimshian, Wakashan, Chimakuan, Salishan, Alsea, Coosan, Kalapuyan, Takelma, and Lower Chinook. Phonological areal traits include:

Series of glottalized stops and affricates
Labiovelars
Multiple laterals
s/š opposition
c/č opposition
voiceless uvular stop q
one fricative series, which is voiceless
velar fricatives
highly limited inventory of labial consonants
large inventory of uvular consonants
limited vowel systems

Typical shared morphological traits include:
reduplication processes: including iterative, continuative, progressive, plural, collective
numeral classifiers
alienable/inalienable oppositions in nouns
pronominal plural
nominal plural
verbal reduplication signifying distribution, repetition, etc.
suffixation of tense-aspect markers in verbs
verbal evidential markers
locative-directional markers in the verb
visibility/invisibility opposition in demonstratives
nominal and verbal reduplication signaling the diminutive
passive-like constructions (except for Tlingit)
negative appearing as the first element in a clause regardless of the usual word order
lexically paired singular and plural verb stems

Plateau

The Plateau linguistic area includes Sahaptian, Upper Chinook, Nicola, Cayuse, Molala language, Klamath, Kutenai, and Interior Salishan. Primary shared phonological features of this linguistic area include:
glottalized stops
velar/uvular contrasting series
multiple laterals

Other less salient shared traits are:
labiovelars
one fricative series
velar (and uvular) fricatives
series of glottalized resonants (sonorants) contrasting with plain resonants (except in Sahaptin, Cayuse, Molala, and Kiksht)
word-medial and word-final consonant clusters of four or more consonants (except in Kiksht, and uncertain in Cayuse and Molala)
vowel systems of only 3 or 4 vowel positions (except Nez Perce, which has 5)
vowel-length contrast
size-shape-affective sound symbolism involving consonantal interchanges
pronominal plural
nominal plural
prefixation of subject person markers of verbs
suffixation of tense-aspect markers in verbs
several kinds of reduplication (except in Nicola)
numeral classifiers (shared by Salishan and Sahaptian languages)
locative-directional markers in verbs
different roots of the singular and the plural for various actions, such as 'sit', 'stand', 'take' (except in Kutenai and Lillooet, uncertain in Cayuse and Molala)
quinary-decimal numerical system (Haruo Aoki 1975)

Northern California
The Northern California linguistic area consists of many Hokan languages. Languages include Algic, Athabaskan, Yukian, Miwokan, Wintuan, Maiduan, Klamath-Modoc, Pomo, Chimariko, Achomawi, Atsugewi, Karuk, Shasta, Yana, (Washo).

Features of this linguistic area have been described by Mary Haas. They include:
rarity of uvular consonants: they occur in Klamath, Wintu, Chimariko, and Pomoan
retroflexed stops
rarity of a distinct series of voiced stops except in the east–west strip of languages including Kashaya Pomo, Wintu-Patwin, and Maidu (this series contains implosion in Maidu)
consonant sound symbolism: in Yurok, Wiyot, Hupa, Tolowa, Karuk, and Yana

Washo, spoken in the Great Basin area, shares some traits common to the Northern California linguistic area.
pronominal dual
quinary/decimal numeral system
absence of vowel-initial syllables
free stress

Clear Lake
This is clearly a linguistic area, and is centered around Clear Lake, California. Languages are Lake Miwok, Patwin, East and Southeastern Pomo, and Wappo. Shared features include:

retroflexed dentals
voiceless l (ɬ)
glottalized glides
3 series of stops

South Coast Range
Languages in Sherzer's (1976) "Yokuts-Salinan-Chumash" area, which includes Chumash, Esselen, and Salinan, share the following traits.

3 series of stops - also in the Clear Lake area
retroflexed sounds - also in the Clear Lake area
glottalized resonants (sonorants)
prefixation of verbal subject markers)
presence of /h, ɨ, c, ŋ/ in the Greater South Coast Range area
t/ṭ (retroflex/non-retroflex) contrast in the Greater South Coast Range area, as well as other parts of California

Great Basin
This linguistic area is defined by Sherzer (1973, 1976) and Jacobsen (1980). Languages are Numic (Uto-Aztecan) and Washo. Shared traits include:
k/kʷ contrast
bilabial fricatives /ɸ, β/
presence of /xʷ, ŋ, ɨ/
overtly marked nominal system
inclusive/exclusive pronominal distinction

However, the validity of this linguistic area is doubtful, as pointed out by Jacobsen (1986), since many traits of the Great Basin area are also common to California languages. It may be an extension of the Northern California linguistic area.

Southern California–Western Arizona
This linguistic area has been demonstrated in Hinton (1991). Languages are Yuman, Cupan (Uto-Aztecan), less extensively Takic and (Uto-Aztecan). Shared traits include:

k/q distinction
presence of /kʷ, tʃ, x/

The Yuman and Cupan languages share the most areal features, such as:
kʷ/qʷ contrast
s/ʂ contrast
r/l contrast
presence of /xʷ, ɲ, lʲ/
small vowel inventory
sound symbolism

The influence is strongly unidirectional from Yuman to Cupan, since the features considered divergent within the Takic subgroup. According to Sherzer (1976), many of these traits are also common to Southern California languages.

Shaul and Andresen (1989) have proposed a Southwestern Arizona ("Hohokam") linguistic area as well, where speakers of Piman languages are hypothesized to have interacted with speakers of Yuman languages as part of the Hohokam archaeological culture. The single trait defining this area is the presence of retroflex stops (/ʈ/ in Yuman, /ɖ/ in Piman).

Pueblo

The Pueblo linguistic area consists of Keresan, Tanoan, Zuni, Hopi, and some Apachean branches.

Plains
The Plains Linguistic Area, according to Sherzer (1973:773), is the "most recently constituted of the culture areas of North America (late eighteenth and nineteenth century)." Languages are Athabaskan, Algonquian, Siouan, Tanoan, Uto-Aztecan, and Tonkawa. The following areal traits are characteristic of this linguistic area, though they are also common in other parts of North America.

prefixation of subject person markers in verbs
pronominal plurals

Frequent traits, which are not shared by all languages, include:
one stop series
the voiceless velar fricative /x/
alienable/inalienable opposition in nouns
nominal plural suffix
inclusive/exclusive opposition (in first person plural pronouns)
nominal diminutive suffix
animate/inanimate gender
evidential markers in verbs
lack of labiovelars (other than Comanche and the languages of the Southern Plains subregion)
presence of /ð/ (eastern Plains subregion only)

Southern Plains areal traits include:
phonemic pitch
presence of /kʷ, r/
voiced/voiceless fricatives

Northeast
The Northeast linguistic area consists of Winnebago (Siouan), Northern Iroquoian, and Eastern Algonquian. Central areal traits of the Northeast Linguistic Area include the following (Sherzer 1976).

a single series of stops (especially characteristic of the Northeast)
a single series of fricatives
presence of /h/
nominal plural
noun incorporation

In New England, areal traits include:
vowel system with /i, e, o, a/
nasalized vowels
pronominal dual

New England Eastern Algonquian languages and Iroquoian languages share the following traits.

nasalized vowels (best-known feature); for instance, Proto-Eastern Algonquian *a- is nasalized due to influence from Iroquioan languages, which have two nasalized vowels in its proto-language, *ɛ̃ and *õ.
pronominal dual

The boundary between the Northeast and Southeast linguistic areas is not clearly determined, since features often extend over to territories belonging to both linguistic areas.

Southeast

Gulf languages include Muskogean, Chitimacha, Atakapa, Tunica language, Natchez, Yuchi, Ofo (Siouan), Biloxi (Siouan) –  sometimes also Tutelo, Catawban, Quapaw, Dhegiha (all Siouan); Tuscarora, Cherokee, and Shawnee.

Bilabial or labial fricatives (/ɸ/, sometimes /f/) are considered by Sherzer (1976) to be the most characteristic trait of the Southeast Linguistic Area. Various other shared traits have been found by Robert L. Rankin (1986, 1988) and T. Dale Nicklas (1994).

Mesoamerican

This linguistic area consists of the following language families and branches.

Mayan
Oto-Manguean (except Chichimeco-Jonaz and some varieties of Pame north of the Mesoamerican boundary)
Mixe–Zoque
Totonacan
Aztecan (a Southern Uto-Aztecan branch)
Purépecha
Huave
Tequistlatec
Cuitlatec

Some languages formerly considered to be part of the Mesoamerican sprachbund, but are now considered to lack main diagnostic traits of Mesoamerican area languages, include Cora, Huichol, Lenca, Jicaquean, and Misumalpan.

Mayan

The Mayan Linguistic Area is considered by most scholars to be part of the Mesoamerican area. However, Holt & Bright (1976) distinguish it as a separate area, and include the Mayan, Xincan, Lencan, and Jicaquean families as part of the Mayan Linguistic Area. Shared traits include:

presence of glottalized consonants and alveolar affricates
absence of voiced obstruents and labiovelar stops

Colombian–Central American
Colombian–Central American consists of Chibchan, Misumalpan, Mangue, and Subtiaba; sometimes Lencan, Jicaquean, Chochoan, and Betoi are also included.

This linguistic area is characterized by SOV word order and postpositions. This stands in contrast to the Mesoamerican Linguistic Area, where languages do not have SOV word order.

Holt & Bright (1976) define a Central American Linguistic Area as having the following areal traits. Note that these stand in direct opposition to the traits defined in their Mayan Linguistic Area.
presence of voiced obstruents and labiovelar stops (absent in the Mayan area)
absence of glottalized consonants and alveolar affricates (present in the Mayan area)

Constenla's (1991) Colombian–Central American area consists primarily of Chibchan languages, but also include Lencan, Jicaquean, Misumalpan, Chocoan, and Betoi (Constenla 1992:103). This area consists of the following areal traits.
voicing opposition in stops and fricatives
exclusive SOV word order
postpositions
mostly Genitive-Noun order
Noun-Adjective order
Noun-Numeral order
clause-initial question words
suffixation or postposed particle for negatives (in most languages)
absence of gender opposition in pronouns and inflection
absence of possessed/nonpossessed and alienable/inalienable possession oppositions
"morpholexical economy" - presence of lexical compounds rather than independent roots. This is similar to calques found in Mesoamerica, but with a more limited number of compounding elements. For instance, in Guatuso (as in Athabaskan languages), there is one compounding element of liquid substances, one compounding element for pointed extremities, one for flat surfaces, and so on.

Venezuelan–Antillean

This linguistic area, consisting of Arawakan, Cariban, Guamo, Otomaco, Yaruro, and Warao, is characterized by VO word order (instead of SOV), and is described by Constenla (1991). Shared traits are:

exclusive VO word order, and absence of SOV word order
absence of voicing opposition in obstruents
Numeral-Noun order
Noun-Genitive order
presence of prepositions

The Venezuelan–Antillean could also extend to the western part of the Amazon Culture Area (Amazonia), where there are many Arawakan languages with VO word order (Constenla 1991).

Andean

This linguistic area, consisting of Quechuan, Aymaran, Callahuaya, and Chipaya, is characterized by SOV word order and elaborate suffixing.

Quechuan and Aymaran languages both have:
SOV basic word order
suffixing morphology; other similar morphological structures

Büttner's (1983:179) includes Quechuan, Aymaran, Callahuaya, and Chipaya. Puquina, an extinct but significant language in this area, appears to not share these phonological features. Shared phonological traits are:
glottalized stops and affricates (not found in all varieties of Quechuan)
aspirated stops and affricates (not found in Chipaya)
uvular stops
presence of /ɲ, lʲ/
retroflexed affricates (retroflexed /ʃ/ and /t͡ʃ/) - more limited in distribution
absence of glottal stop /ʔ/
limited vowel systems with /i, a, u/ (not in Chipaya)

Constenla (1991) defines a broader Andean area including the languages of highland Colombia, Ecuador, Peru, and Bolivia, and possibly also some lowland languages east of that Andes that have features typical of the Andean area. This area has the following areal traits.

absence of the high-mid opposition in back vowels
absence of the opposition of voiced/voiceless affricates
presence of the voiceless alveolar affricate, voiceless prepalatal fricative, palatal lateral, palatal nasal, retroflexed fricatives or affricates
Adjective-Noun order
clause-initial interrogative words
accusative case
genitive case
passive construction

Statistical studies

Quantitative studies on the Andes and overlapping areas have found the following traits to be characteristic of these areas in a statistically significant way.

Morphosyntactic features
A statistical study of argument marking features in languages of South America found that both the Andes and Western South America constitute linguistic areas, with some traits showing a statistically significant relationship to both areas. The unique and shared traits of the two areas are shown in the following table. (The wordings of the traits are directly from the source.)

Phonological features
Phonologically, the following segments and segmental features are areal for the Andes:

Consonants
A contrast between aspirated and ejective in the stops and the postalveolar affricate
A "comparatively large number of affricates, fricatives, and liquids"
The palatal place of articulation (in nasals and liquids)
The uvular place of articulation (in stops and fricatives)
The absence of the following types of consonants:
Voiced alveolar stop and affricate
Labialized velar voiceless stop and nasal
Voiced bilabial and voiceless labiodental fricatives
Glottal stop and fricative

Vowels
The presence of short /u/ and long /iː, uː, aː/
The absence of mid and non-low central vowels and nasal vowels, and "long versions of many of these vowels."

Ecuadorian–Colombian
This is a subarea of the Andean Linguistic Area, as defined by Constenla (1991). Languages include Páez, Guambiano (Paezan), Cuaiquer, Cayapa, Colorado (Barbacoan), Camsá, Cofán, Esmeralda, and Ecuadorian Quechua. Shared traits are:

high-mid opposition in the front vowels
absence of glottalized consonants
presence of the glottal stop /ʔ/, voiceless labial fricative /ɸ/
absence of uvular stops /q, ɢ/
rounding opposition in non-front vowels
lack of person inflection in nouns
prefixes expressing tenses or aspects

Orinoco–Amazon
The Orinoco–Amazon Linguistic Area, or the Northern Amazon Culture Area, is identified by Migliazza (1985 [1982]). Languages include Yanomaman, Piaroa (Sálivan), Arawakan/Maipurean, Cariban, Jotí, Uruak/Ahuaqué, Sapé (Kaliana), and Máku. Common areal traits are:

a shared pattern of discourse redundancy (Derbyshire 1977)
ergative alignment (except in a few Arawakan languages)
objects preceding verbs, such as SOV and OVS word orders (except in a few Arawakan languages)
lack of active-passive distinction
relative clauses formed by apposition and nominalization

The following traits have diffused to west to east (Migliazza 1985 [1982]):
nasalization
aspiration
glottalization

Amazon

The Amazon linguistic area includes the Arawakan/Maipurean, Arauan/Arawan, Cariban, Chapacuran, Ge/Je, Panoan, Puinavean, Tacanan, Tucanoan, and Tupian families.

Derbyshire & Pullum (1986) and Derbyshire (1987) describe the characteristics of this linguistic area in detail. Traits include:

objects preceding subjects, such as VOS, OVS, and OSV word orders. Word order in OVS and OSV languages tends to be highly flexible.
verb agreement with both subject and object (additionally, null realization of subject and object nominals or free pronouns, which means that sentences frequently lack full noun-phrase subjects or objects)
predictability of when subjects and objects will be full noun phrases or when they will be signaled by verbal affixes (depending on whether they represent "new" or "given" information")
use of nominalizations for relative clauses and other subordinate clauses (in many cases, there are no true subordinate clauses at all)
nominal modifiers following their head nouns
no agentive passive constructions (except Palikur)
indirect speech forms are nonexistent in most languages and rare in the languages that do have them; thus, they rely on direct speech constructions.
absence of coordinating conjunctions (juxtaposition is used to express coordination instead)
extensive use of right-dislocated paratactic constructions (sequences of noun phrases, adverbials, or postpositional phrases, in which the whole sequence has only one grammatical relation in the sentence)
extensive use of particles that are phrasal subconstituents syntactically and phonologically, but are sentence operators or modifiers semantically
tendency toward ergative subject marking
highly complex morphology

Noun classifier systems are also common across Amazonian languages. Derbyshire & Payne (1990) list three basic types of classifier systems.

Numeral: lexico-syntactic forms, which are often obligatory in expressions of quantity and normally are separate words.
Concordial: a closed grammatical system, consisting of morphological affixes or clitics and expressing class agreement with some head noun. However, they may also occur on nouns or verbs.
Verb incorporation: lexical items are incorporated into the verb stem, signaling some classifying entity of the associated noun phrase.

Derbyshire (1987) also notes that Amazonian languages tend to have:
ergatively organized systems (in whole or in part)
evidence of historical drift from ergative to accusative marking
certain types of split systems

Mason (1950) has found that in many languages of central and eastern Brazil, words end in vowels, and stress is ultimate (i.e., falls on the final syllable).

Lucy Seki (1999) has also proposed an Upper Xingu Linguistic Area in northern Brazil.

Validity
The validity of Amazonia as a linguistic area has been called into question by recent research, including quantitative studies. A study of argument marking parameters in 74 South American languages by Joshua Birchall found that “not a single feature showed an areal distribution for Amazonia as a macroregion. This suggest that Amazonia is not a good candidate for a linguistic area based on the features examined in this study.” Instead, Birchall finds evidence for three “macroregions” in South America: the Andes, Western South America, and Eastern South America, with some overlap in features between Andes and Western South America.

Based on that study and similar findings, Patience Epps and Lev Michael claim that “an emerging consensus points to Amazonia not forming a linguistic area sensu strictu.”

Epps (2015) shows that Wanderwort are spread across the languages of Amazonia. Morphosyntax is also heavily borrowed across neighboring unrelated Amazonian languages.

Mamoré–Guaporé

Crevels and van der Voort (2008) propose a Mamoré–Guaporé linguistic area in eastern lowland Bolivia (in Beni Department and Santa Cruz Department) and Rondonia, Brazil. In Bolivia, many of the languages were historically spoken at the Jesuit Missions of Moxos and also the Jesuit Missions of Chiquitos. Language families and branches in the linguistic area include Arawakan, Chapacuran, Jabuti, Rikbaktsá, Nambikwaran, Pano-Tacanan, and Tupian (Guarayo, Kawahib, Arikem, Tupari, Monde, and Ramarama) languages. Language isolates in the linguistic area are Cayuvava, Itonama, Movima, Chimane/Mosetén, Canichana, Yuracaré, Leco, Mure, Aikanã, Kanoê, and Kwazá, Irantxe, and Chiquitano. Areal features include:

 a high incidence of prefixes
 evidentials
 directionals
 verbal number
 lack of nominal number
 lack of classifiers
 inclusive/exclusive distinction

Muysken et al. (2014) also performed a detailed statistical analysis of the Mamoré–Guaporé linguistic area.

Chaco

Campbell and Grondona (2012) consider the Mataco–Guaicuru, Mascoyan, Lule-Vilelan, Zamucoan, and some southern Tupi-Guarani languages to be part of a Chaco linguistic area. Common Chaco areal features include SVO word order and active-stative verb alignment. Features include:

gender that not overtly marked on nouns, but is present in demonstratives, depending on the gender of the nouns modified
genitive classifiers for possessed domestic animals
SVO word order
active-stative verb alignment
large set of directional verbal affixes
demonstrative system with rich contrasts including visible vs. not visible
some adjectives as polar negatives
resistance to borrowing foreign words

South Cone
The languages of the South Cone area, including Mapudungu (Araucanian), Guaycuruan, and Chon, share the following traits (Klein 1992):

Semantic notions of position signaled morphologically by means of "many devices to situate the visual location of the noun subject or object relative to the speaker; tense, aspect and number are expressed as part of the morphology of location, direction, and motion" (Klein 1992:25).
palatalization
more back consonants than front consonants
SVO basic word order

See also
Classification of indigenous languages of the Americas

Notes

References
Birchall, Joshua. 2015. Argument marking patterns in South American languages. Radboud Universiteit Nijmegen: PhD Dissertation.
Campbell, Lyle. 1997. American Indian languages: the historical linguistics of Native America. Oxford: Oxford University Press.
Epps, Patience and Lev Michael. To appear. "The areal linguistics of Amazonia."
Constenla Umaña, Adolfo. 1991. Las lenguas del área intermedia: introducción a su estudio areal. San José: Editorial de la Universidad de Costa Rica.
Holt, Dennis and William Bright. 1976. "La lengua paya y las fronteras lingüística de Mesoamérica." Las fronteras de Mesoamérica. La 14a mesa redonda, Sociedad Mexicana de Antropología 1:149-156.
Michael, Lev, Will Chang, and Tammy Stark. 2012. "Exploring phonological areality in the circum-Andean region using a Naive Bayes Classifier." Language Dynamics and Change 4(1): 27–86. (Page numbers in this article refer to the pages of the linked PDF, not the journal version.)
Sherzer, Joel. 1973. "Areal linguistics in North America." In Linguistics in North America, ed. Thomas A. Sebeok, 749–795. (CTL, vol. 10.) The Hague: Mouton.
Sherzer, Joel. 1976. An areal-typological study of American Indian languages north of Mexico. Amsterdam: North-Holland.

External links

Languages of hunter-gatherers and their neighbors: A collection of lexical, grammatical, and other information about languages spoken by hunter-gatherers and their neighbors.
South American Indigenous Language Structures (SAILS)

Indigenous languages of the Americas
Linguistic typology
Sprachbund